Karam Dosa is a 2016 Telugu drama-comedy-social film written and directed by Trivikram.G and produced by Veenaa Vedika Productions Private Limited. It features Shivakumar Ramachandravarapu in a lead role, as well as Surya Sreenivas, Vankayala Satya Narayana and actor-director Y. Kasi Viswanath in prominent roles. The National Film Award winning editor Suresh Urs worked as editor for this movie. The film released on 30 December 2016. The movie’s dialogues need a special mention as they have been written quite cleverly with a lot of fun and good emotions during the climax.

Plot

The basic plot of the movie is very simple and casual; it says 'Stop talking and start taking small steps towards your big goals. It helps self and society.’ 
Vemana, 27, is very talented and wants to do something really big in life. His heart is in the right place but he seems directionless. He has a blind follower too, Bali, a confused soul. Like every crazy guy , Vemana and Bali also have a sensible, employed friend and that’s Ravi. Ravi’s life has two parts. One, fixing these guys and two, getting married. In spite of satisfying hot requirements of the marriage market, somehow none of his trails work. One day, fed up with Ravi’s continuous follow ups on his career, Vemana takes it as a challenge and promises to achieve something in the next 6months.

Another important character in the story is mess owner Satyanarayana(75). Picchayya mess is popular for two things. One is spicy karam dosa and two Mess Owner . “Keep everyone around happy” is Mess owner’s philosophy. His simple life appears to be confined to mess. However as the story progresses, audience understand what he actually is. In a scene Mess owner gets to know about Vemana from Ravi and offers his help to fix him. They try to employ Vemana in a transport office but Vemana rejects it as a menial job for his calibre.

Then enters a character named ‘VenkataRamana’ who hails from the same village as these three friends. Like the entire village he also thinks Vemana is employed and decides to stay with them for career guidance. Innocence or arrogance ? (అమాయకత్వమా? బలుపా?) is a question that remains unanswered in the case of Venakata Ramana.

Troubled by Ramana’s presence and his questions, Vemana decides to take up the transport office job temporarily. From there on Vemana’s struggles increase and reality hits him. At a point he acknowledges that he is being very unrealistic. What lifts him from that low point is the life story of the Mess owner, who in spite of all odds picks up a very small idea and with time makes a great impact on the lives of many. Inspired by this, Vemana also decides to take small steps towards his big goal. Story ends with a humble win for Vemana in the direction he wanted.

Cast
 Shivakumar Ramachandravarapu as Vemana
 Surya Sreenivas as Ravi
 Anil Makireddy as Bali
 Vankayala Sathyanarayana as Sathyanarayana
 Y. Kasi Viswanath as Transport Office Owner
 Anil as Bali
 Chandana as Vani
Satthya
 Adabala as Puchuko
 Pardhu Reddy as Fruit Business Man

Crew
 Directed by Trivikram G
 Edited by	Suresh Urs
 Line Producer by Pardhu Reddy
 PRO by Pardhu Reddy

Songs
The soundtrack consists of three songs composed by Siddarth Watkins and written by Sreeram Samji. The songs were released on 8 October 2016 at Prasad's Preview Theatre in Hyderabad. Raj Kandukuri, Y. Kasi Viswanath, Anand Kuchibotla and many other celebrities attended the function.

References

External links

 
 

2010s Telugu-language films
2016 films